Pass It Around is the title of Donavon Frankenreiter's third album, released on August 19, 2008 (see 2008 in music).

Track listing
"Life, Love & Laughter" – 3:12 (Donavon Frankenreiter; Squeak E. Clean)
"Too Much Water" – 3:32 (Donavon Frankenreiter; Lehning; Tashian)
"Come with Me" – 3:29 (Cockrell; Donavon Frankenreiter)
"Your Heart"  – 2:46 (Cockrell; Donavon Frankenreiter)
"Hit the Ground Running" – 3:40 (Donavon Frankenreiter; McQuien)
"Mansions on the Sand" – 5:03 (Donavon Frankenreiter; McQuien)
"Someone's Something" – 3:38 (Daly; Donavon Frankenreiter)
"Sing a Song" – 3:52 (Donavon Frankenreiter)
"Pass It Around" – 4:53 (Donavon Frankenreiter)
"Come Together" – 3:06 (Donavon Frankenreiter; Fox; Frazier)

Australian Special Edition Bonus Track
"Can't Go On Without You" - 4:04 (Donavon Frankenreiter)

Brazilian/European Edition Bonus Track
"Everything to Me" - 3:57 (Donavon Frankenreiter)

Japanese Edition has both bonus tracks

Personnel
Joe Chiccarelli - Producer, Mix Engineer
Squeak E. Clean - Composer, Producer
Graham Hope - Recording Engineer
Bob Ludwig - Mastering
Bill Mimms - Assistant Engineer
Donavon Frankenreiter - Guitar, Vocals
Ben Harper - Guitar, Vocals
G. Love - Harmonica
Thad Cockrell - Vocals (Background)
Matt Cusson - Vocals (Background)
Grant Lee Phillips - Guitar, Vocals (Background)
Bruce Kaphan - Guitars
Arnold McCuller - Vocals (Background)
Daniel Tashian - Vocals (Background)
Tim Pierce - Guitars
Craig Barnette - Drums
Victor Indrizzo - Drums
Matt Grundy - Bass, Vocals (Background)
Eric Brigmond - Keyboards, Horns
Luis Conte - Percussion
Z. Jimmy - Wind Instruments

Charts

References 

2008 albums
Donavon Frankenreiter albums
Albums produced by Joe Chiccarelli
Lost Highway Records albums